Rodolphe Kasser (14 January 1927 – 8 October 2013), was a Swiss philologist, archaeologist, and a Coptic scholar. He was an expert in translation of ancient Coptic language manuscripts.

Biography 
Born in Yverdon-les-Bains, Switzerland, Kasser obtained his higher education in theology in Lausanne and in Paris from 1946 to 1950 and a diploma from the École Pratique des Hautes Études (Ph.D. equivalent) in Paris in 1964. He conducted pastoral ministry in Switzerland and in France from 1953 to 1959.

From 1963 to 1998 he was on the staff at the Faculty of Arts of the University of Geneva, lecturing in Coptic languages and literature. First as professor extraordinary from 1963 to 1976, then as professor from 1976 to 1998. After 1965 he was the head of the archaeological excavations of the Swiss Mission of Coptic Archaeology in the Kellia, Lower Egypt.

After 1962, Kasser did important research in the field of Coptic philology, including the preparation of a new Coptic dictionary. This work was done in parallel with reforms in Coptic dialectal classification. He published several important Greek and Coptic codices of the Bodmeriana Library, most of them biblical.

After 2000, Kasser organized the restoration and prepared the edition princeps of Codex Tchacos, containing the Gospel of Judas and three other Coptic gnostic texts.

Noted publications 
His latest published work was an English translation of a 1,700-year-old copy of the "Gospel of Judas". The papyrus manuscript went on display at the National Geographic Society's museum in Washington DC in April 2006.

The translation contends that the most vilified man in Christendom understood Jesus better than any of the other disciples. The disciple who betrayed Jesus was actually doing the bidding of Christ himself. However, this interpretation has been contested by many academics since the gospel's initial publication.

References

External links 
Kasser's s translation shows Judas in a positive light
Books by Rodolphe Kasser

Swiss philologists
Coptologists
Ancient Egyptian language
1927 births
2013 deaths
People from Yverdon-les-Bains